Anthony C. Ferrante is an American film director, producer, and writer, known for directing the Sharknado series, the 2017 thriller Forgotten Evil and the 2005 ghost story Boo, which was his feature film writing and directing debut.

Career
Ferrante grew up in Antioch, California. When he was attending Antioch High School, he took a film studies class at Los Medanos College. His first film was shot at the El Campanil Theatre. He would later get his  bachelor arts degree in film studies at San Francisco State.

In addition to his film career, he has written a comic, Archie vs. Sharknado, which is a tie-in to Sharknado 3: Oh Hell No! and is illustrated by Dan Parent. He also formed the band Quint with actor / musician Robbie Rist. They have written and performed songs for every Sharknado movie including the theme song "(The Ballad of) Sharknado". Before moving to movies full-time, Ferrante was the editor-in-chief of (the now defunct) Cinescape magazine and a writer for Fangoria.

Filmography

References

External links

Living people
Year of birth missing (living people)
San Francisco State University alumni
People from Antioch, California
Horror film directors
Film directors from California
American people of Italian descent